Myctophum affine, the metallic lanternfish, is a species of lanternfish native to the Atlantic Ocean. Myctophum affine grows to a length of  SL.

Description 
Phenotypic observations of Myctophum affine presume that males carry dorsal luminous scales, while females of the species have luminous ventral scales. It is stated that males typically possess seven or eight luminous dorsal scales, while females usually have three to four luminous ventral scales. The luminous scales of male Myctophum affine begin to develop at smaller sizes than those of the female (Gibbs, 1957).

References
 
 Gibbs, R. H. (1957). A taxonomic analysis of Myctophum affine and M. nitidulum, two lantern-fishes previously synonymized, in the western North Atlantic. Deep Sea Research (1953), 4(1), 230–237. Science Direct. https://doi.org/10.1016/0146-6313(56)90055-7
Hulley, P.A., 1990. Myctophidae. p. 398-467. In J.C. Quero, J.C. Hureau, C. Karrer, A. Post and L. Saldanha (eds.) Check-list of the fishes of the eastern tropical Atlantic (CLOFETA). JNICT, Lisbon; SEI; Paris; and UNESCO, Paris. Vol. 1.

Myctophidae
Taxa named by Christian Frederik Lütken
Fish described in 1892